Jakarta Undercover is a 2007 Indonesian movie, based on the bestseller novel by Moammar Emka. The film was directed by Lance, written by Joko Anwar, and stars Luna Maya, Lukman Sardi, Verdi Solaiman, Christian Sugiono, Laura Annonetta, and Ammee Juliette. This film was released on March 22, 2007.

Plot
After accidentally killing her temperamental father in order to save her mom from his abuse, Vickytra (Luna Maya) flees from Medan to Jakarta with her autistic brother, Ara (Kenshiro Arashi). To make ends meet in Jakarta, Viki poses as a transvestite and works as a striptease dancer. With no one to watch over her brother, Vicky brings Ara every night to the club where she works and hides him in one corner of the room at the club. One day, Ara accidentally witnesses an act of murder by Haryo (Lukman Sardi), son of an official, and his friends. Realizing his crime was witnessed by Ara, Haryo and his friends chase Viki and Ara, determined to silence the two before they go to the police. For the sake of saving his brother's life, Viki secretly flees from one place to another in 
order to escape Haryo and friends.

Information 

 

Indonesian thriller drama films